Giacinto Facchetti (18 July 1942 – 4 September 2006) was an Italian footballer who played as a left-back for Inter Milan from 1960 to 1978. He later served as Inter chairman from January 2004 until his death in 2006. He played 634 official games for the club, scoring 75 goals, and was a member of "Grande Inter" team under manager Helenio Herrera which won four Serie A titles, a Coppa Italia, two European Cups, and two Intercontinental Cups. He placed second for the Ballon d'Or in 1965.

Facchetti represented Italy internationally on 94 occasions, including three FIFA World Cups. He was also elected to the 1970 World Cup All-Star Team, in which Italy were runners-up. He was also captain of the national side that won Italy's first ever UEFA European Championship on home soil in 1968, where he was also elected to the team of the tournament.

Facchetti is remembered as one of the first truly great attacking full-backs. He is regarded as one of the best football players ever at his position, due to his pace, technique, intelligence, physique, and stamina. He formed a formidable defensive partnership with fellow full-back Tarcisio Burgnich in Inter's defensive catenaccio system and with the Italian national side. In addition to his ability on the pitch, Facchetti was lauded for his discipline and leadership and captained both Inter Milan and Italy for several years.

In March 2004, Pelé named him one of the Top 125 greatest living footballers as part of FIFA's 100th anniversary celebrations. In 2015, he was posthumously inducted into the Italian Football Hall of Fame.

Club career

Born in Treviglio, in the Province of Bergamo (Lombardy), Facchetti began his career with his hometown club, GSD Mario Zanconti, as a forward, due to his pace, powerful shot, and technique. While playing for Trevigliese, he was noticed by Helenio Herrera, then manager of Inter, who launched him in Serie A in the late 1960–61 season as an attacking full-back on the left, due to his physique, energy, and tackling ability, in addition to his offensive attributes; he made his club and top-flight debut on 21 May 1961, in a 2–0 away win over Roma.

The change of role proved to be an effective choice, and eventually Facchetti developed into one of the most effective defenders in Italian football, forming a notable partnership in defence with fellow Italian full-back Burgnich. Facchetti's innovative playing style as one of the first European overlapping full-backs, combining hard defending with offensive prowess, played a key role in the defensive, yet counter-attacking catenaccio system of Herrera's "Grande Inter" side that dominated Italian, European, and World Football in the 60s; whilst conceding few goals defensively, Facchetti was also able to contribute offensively with numerous goals and assists. He held the record for most goals in a single Serie A season by a defender, with 10 goals scored during the 1965–66 season, until it was broken by Marco Materazzi during the 2000–01 season.

Facchetti spent his entire professional career with Inter, later captaining the side, after Armando Picchi, Mario Corso, and Sandro Mazzola, during his final season with the club, between 1977–78. With his club, Facchetti won four scudetti in 1963, 1965, 1966 and 1971; one Italian Cup in 1978; two European Cups in 1964 and 1965; and two Intercontinental Cups in 1964 and 1965. Due to his performances for Inter, Facchetti also narrowly missed the opportunity to become the first defender to win the Ballon d'Or, placing second in 1965, after narrowly missing out on a treble winning season with Inter that year; Inter won the Serie A and the European Cup, but were defeated in the 1965 Coppa Italia final by Juventus. Facchetti's 59 goals in Serie A make him the most prolific defender in the history of the Italian league.

International career

Facchetti made his debut for Italy on 23 March 1963, in a 1–0 away win in a European qualifier against Turkey. He was capped 94 times (a record at the time, since overtaken only by Dino Zoff, Paolo Maldini, Fabio Cannavaro and Gianluigi Buffon) wearing the captain's armband 70 times and scoring three goals between 1963 and 1977; he is currently his nation's ninth-highest appearance holder. He played for his country at the 1966, 1970, and 1974 FIFA World Cups, captaining Italy in the latter two editions of the tournament. Facchetti also captained the Italian squad to victory at Euro 1968, wearing the number 10 shirt, after advancing to the finals by calling the coin toss correctly following extra time against the Soviet Union, before winning the final over Yugoslavia 2–0 in the replay match, as well as being named to the Team of the Tournament. He was also named to the Team of the Tournament in the 1970 World Cup, where he helped his team to the final of the tournament, only to be defeated 4–1 by Brazil.

Style of play
Regarded as one of the greatest full-backs of all time, Facchetti's pace, stamina, power, and excellent physical and technical traits allowed him to excel as an offensive full-back or wing-back; a former forward and midfielder, he was known for his ability to make attacking runs down the left flank and get into good offensive positions in the area which allowed him to either score or assist goals, due to his powerful shot and crossing ability, and was known for his tendency to cut into the centre in order to strike on goal, which was very unusual for full-backs at the time. A strong, large, elegant, and hard-working footballer, who was good in the air, he was highly regarded for his ability with either foot, as well as his distribution, and ball skills; he also excelled defensively, playing as a sweeper as he lost some of his pace later in his career, due to his technical skills, distribution, intelligence and ability to read the game or start plays from the back after winning back the ball, as well as his man-marking ability, positioning, anticipation and tackling. A precocious talent in his youth, he also stood out for his longevity in his later career. In addition to his footballing ability, he was also known for his correct behaviour on the pitch, as well as his leadership; he was sent off only once throughout his entire career, for sarcastically applauding the referee.

After retirement

Over the years Facchetti held various managerial positions at Inter Milan, including technical director, board member, worldwide ambassador, and vice-chairman. Facchetti was elected chairman of Inter on 19 January 2004, following the resignation of previous president Massimo Moratti. After a long illness, he died of pancreatic cancer in Milan on 4 September 2006. He is survived by his wife, Giovanna, and four children.

Calciopoli
The role of Facchetti within the events of Calciopoli remained the subject of debate. As chairman of Inter, which benefitted from the decisions of the sports justice, he was charged of Article 6 violation, those related to sporting illicit warranting relegation, by the FIGC prosecutor Stefano Palazzi in July 2011. Palazzi presented a report on the Calciopoli bis investigation, originating from facts that emerged in the related criminal proceeding in Naples and at the time judged not relevant in the sporting trial five years earlier, in which, among others, Facchetti was accused of violating Article 6 of the then Sports Justice Code, which was an offense consisting of "a consolidated network of relationships, of a non-regulatory nature, directed to alter the principles of impartiality, impartiality and independence of the refereeing sector", actions that Palazzi judged to be "certainly aimed at ensuring an advantage in the standings for Inter." The statute of limitations regarding any acts committed led Palazzi himself to declare the impossibility of proceeding and verifying the allegations. Facchetti was defended, among others, by Moratti, who said that "you can say what you want without a trial but I don't accept it and Inter don't accept it. ... Considering Facchetti as in the accusations of the Federal Prosecutor is offensive, serious and stupid."

In 2010, Luciano Moggi publicly accused Facchetti of sporting illicit. In 2015, Facchetti's son Gianfelice, representing the Facchetti family, sued Moggi for libel. Moggi was acquitted by the Milan court of the charge of defaming Facchetti in a television broadcast. Moggi accused Facchetti "of having also requested and obtained special treatment in the refereeing of Inter's matches". The judge dismissed the lawsuit and acquitted Moggi, finding "with certainty a good truthfulness" in his statements and citing the existence of "a sort of lobbying intervention on the part of the then president of Inter towards the referee class ... , significant of a relationship of a friendly [and] preferential type, [with] heights that are not properly commendable." The sentence was upheld on appeal in 2018, and passed judgment in 2019.

Legacy

In March 2004, Pelé named Facchetti one of the Top 125 greatest living footballers as part of FIFA's 100th anniversary celebrations.

Following Facchetti's death in 2006, he was named one of the year's Golden Foot "Football Legends", and was also the recipient of the FIFA Presidential Award. Known for his discipline as well as his playing ability throughout his career, the Premio internazionale Giacinto Facchetti was also established in his honour later that year, and is currently awarded annually to a football personality who was stood out for their honesty, correct behaviour, and sportsmanship. Also after his death, the Campionato Nazionale Primavera included Facchetti's name for the official renaming of the championship to Campionato Primavera Tim – Trofeo Giacinto Facchetti. His former club, Inter, posthumously retired the number 3 shirt in his honour.

On 22 September 2008, a square in the town of Cesano Maderno, Metropolitan City of Milan, was renamed in honour of Facchetti. Facchetti is featured in the football video game FIFA 14s Classic XI – a multi-national all-star team, along with compatriots Bruno Conti, Gianni Rivera, and Franco Baresi. In 2015, he was posthumously inducted into the Italian Football Hall of Fame.

Career statistics
Club

International

Scores and results list Italy's goal tally first, score column indicates score after each Facchetti goal.

HonoursInter Milan Serie A: 1962–63, 1964–65, 1965–66, 1970–71
 Coppa Italia: 1977–78
 European Cup: 1963–64, 1964–65
 Intercontinental Cup: 1964, 1965Italy UEFA European Championship: 1968
 FIFA World Cup runner-up: 1970Individual FIFA 100 (125 greatest living players, as selected by Pelé): 2004
 Golden Foot "Football Legends": 2006
 FIFA Presidential Award: 2006
 UEFA European Championship Team of the Tournament: 1968
 FIFA World Cup All-Star Team: 1970
 Ballon d'Or (runner-up): 1965
 Italian Football Hall of Fame: 2015
Inter Milan Hall of Fame: 2019Orders'
Commander of the Order of Merit of the Italian Republic: 1994

See also 
 List of one-club men in association football

References

External links

Giacinto Facchetti Official Website, official Italian website of Giacinto Facchetti
Fans’ Tributes 
Inter profile 
Profile at Italia1910.com 
Profile at Enciclopedia del Calcio 
Profile at FIGC  
FIFA Profile

1942 births
2006 deaths
People from Treviglio
Deaths from pancreatic cancer
FIFA 100
1966 FIFA World Cup players
1970 FIFA World Cup players
1974 FIFA World Cup players
UEFA Euro 1968 players
UEFA European Championship-winning players
UEFA European Championship-winning captains
Italian footballers
Italy international footballers
Association football defenders
Inter Milan players
Italian football chairmen and investors
People involved in the 2006 Italian football scandal
Serie A players
Deaths from cancer in Lombardy
Inter Milan chairmen and investors
UEFA Champions League winning players
Commanders of the Order of Merit of the Italian Republic
Sportspeople from the Province of Bergamo
Footballers from Lombardy